Legislative elections were held in Russia on 18 September 2016, having been brought forward from 4 December. At stake were the 450 seats in the State Duma of the 7th convocation, the lower house of the Federal Assembly. Prior to the election United Russia had been the ruling party since winning the 2011 elections with 49.32% of the vote, and taking 238 seats (53%) of the seats in the State Duma.

Prior to the election, observers expected that turnout would be low and called the election campaign the dullest in recent memory. 109,820,679 voters were registered in the Russian Federation (including Crimea) on 1 January 2016. Taking into account people registered outside the Russian Federation and the voters in Baikonur, the total number of eligible voters for 1 January 2016 was 111,724,534. The vote had a record low turnout of 47.88%, with just 28% of Muscovites casting their votes before 6 pm.

Background
Although the elections had been planned for 4 December 2016, deputies discussed the issue of rescheduling to an earlier date since the spring of 2015, with the second and third Sundays of September or October 2016 as possible alternatives. On 1 July 2015, the Constitutional Court of Russia accepted the possibility of conducting early elections to the Duma in 2016 under certain conditions. According to the Court, the constitution does not require the election date to be exactly five years after the previous elections and the election date can be shifted if the following conditions are met:
Shifting of the election date does not disrupt reasonable periodicity of elections.
Limiting of the real terms of the Duma deputies is insignificant (less than a few months).
Shifting of the election dates is announced in advance, so to give all the parties enough time to prepare for the elections.

On 19 June 2015, the State Duma approved the first reading of a bill to bring the election to the State Duma forward from 4 December 2016 to the third Sunday of September 2016. The corresponding bill was adopted by the State Duma on the second and third (and final) reading with 339 deputies in favour and 102 against, with no abstentions. The document was put together by the speaker of the Duma, Sergei Naryshkin, along with three leaders of major Duma parties, Vladimir Vasilyev (United Russia), Vladimir Zhirinovsky (Liberal Democratic Party), and Sergei Mironov (A Just Russia). The initiative to transfer the date of elections had not been supported by the deputies of the Communist Party, who called it an unconstitutional decision. Earlier, a similar opinion had been expressed by the leader of the Communist Party, Gennady Zyuganov. The September elections were not satisfactory to the Communists in part because the debate fell in August, "when one will be in the garden, the latter on the beach, others with their children" said Zyuganov. The Russian government supported the bill.

On 17 June 2016, President Vladimir Putin signed a decree on the appointment of the State Duma elections on 18 September 2016. From that day parties had the right to start the nomination process for deputies to hold congresses and transmit documents of candidates to the Central Election Commission of the Russian Federation (CEC) for registration.

For the first time since the controversial and unilateral 2014 Russian annexation of Crimea (from Ukraine), Crimean voters could vote in a Russian general election. Ukraine strongly condemned the vote. Various countries (among them the United States, Canada, the United Kingdom and France) did not recognize the legitimacy of the election in Crimea. According to Russia correspondent for Al Jazeera English Rory Challands reporting on election day, "despite many Crimeans voting in Russian elections for 1st time, there's little excitement. Main sentiments so far are apathy and cynicism." Scuffles between police and Ukrainian nationalists were reported near polling stations for Russian citizens in the Ukrainian cities of Kyiv and Odessa.

In Syria, 4,751 Russian citizens (most of them taking part in the Russian military intervention in Syria) voted.

Electoral system

The State Duma is elected on a single election day for a term of five years, with parallel voting that was used between 1993 and 2003.

Out of 450 seats, 225 are elected by proportional representation from party lists with a 5% electoral threshold, the whole country forming a single constituency. Each political party should adopt a party list which should be divided into a federal part and regional groups. The federal part should have from 1 to 10 candidates, with the rest of the party list candidates comprising the regional groups. There should be at least 35 regional groups. Total number of candidates in a party list should be between 200 and 400.

Seats are allocated using Hare quota and largest remainder method. 

The other 225 seats are elected in single-member constituencies using the first-past-the-post system.

Chronology 

On 17 June, President Vladimir Putin set the date of the election as 18 September 2016. On 20 June the Central Election Commission approved the calendar of the election campaign.

From 18 June to 13 July – Period for nomination of candidates (parties in the federal list and single-mandate constituencies, self-nominated in single member constituencies).
From 4 July to 3 August – Period of registration of federal lists of candidates to the Central Election Commission and of the registration of candidates in single-member constituencies in the district election commissions.
12 August – Draw that decided allocation of parties on the federal-list ballot was held.
16 and 18 August – Draw that decided distribution of free TV time (16 August) and free space for parties or candidates in newspapers (18 August) was held.
From 20 August to 16 September – Election campaign. 
From 3 August to 6 September – Territorial election commissions issue absentee ballots. 
From 7 to 17 September – Voters can get absentee ballots through election commissions at polling station.
17 September – Day of Election silence.
18 September – Election day.

Conduct
The Organization for Security and Co-operation in Europe published its full report of the election on 23 December 2016. It noted many problems with the election, such as the lack of "clear political alternatives [with the main four parliamentary parties, limiting] voters' choice", over-regulation of the registration of political parties, lack of proper conduct during counting of votes, voters not folding their ballots on 70% of occasions and lack of transparency of campaign finance.

Participating parties
The Central Election Commission determined that 14 political parties could submit lists of candidates without collecting signatures. Whilst other parties were required to present at least 200,000 signatures (with a maximum of 7,000 signatures per region).

Parties that participated in the election
Fourteen parties were registered to participate in the election. These are the same fourteen parties that did not have to collect signatures in order to participate. None of the parties tasked with collecting signatures were registered on the ballot due to various violations or failure to submit documents.

Parties that did not participate in the election

Single-member constituencies
In 225 single-member constituencies, candidates could be nominated by a party, or be self-nominated.

Opinion polls

Exit polls

Results

United Russia won a supermajority of seats, allowing them to change the Constitution without the votes of other parties. Turnout was reported as low. Throughout the day there were reports of voting fraud including video purporting to show officials stuffing ballot boxes. Additionally, results in many regions demonstrate that United Russia on many poll stations got anomalously close results, such as 62.2% in more than hundred poll stations in Saratov Oblast, suggesting that the results in these regions likely have been rigged. The government said there was no evidence of any large scale cheating. On 22 September, the Central Electoral Committee canceled the results in seven constituencies, where the number of used ballots exceeded the number of registered voters, or where the authorities were videotaped stuffing the ballots. According to research by University of Michigan political scientists Kirill Kalinin and Walter R. Mebane Jr., the election results are fraudulent.

By region
The breakdown of the party-list results by region is as follows:

By constituency

Notes

References

External links

Central Elections Commission of Russia
WCIOM
FOM
2016 State Duma Elections
Full info on Ura.ru

 
Legislative elections in Russia
Legislative
Political controversies in Russia
Legislative
7th State Duma of the Russian Federation
Russia
Russia